Prince Michał Józef Masalski (c. 1700–1768) was a Polish-Lithuanian nobleman (szlachcic).

He was Grand Clerk of Lithuania from 1726, voivode of Mscislaw Voivodeship from 1737, castellan of Trakai from 1742, castellan of Vilnius and Field Hetman of Lithuania from 1744, and Great Lithuanian Hetman from 1762.  He was Marshal of the Convocation Sejm from 27 April to 23 May 1733 in Warsaw.

Awards
 Knight of the Order of the White Eagle

1700 births
1768 deaths
People from Trakai
People from Trakai Voivodeship
Michal Jozef
Polish nobility
Field Hetmans of the Grand Duchy of Lithuania
Great Hetmans of the Grand Duchy of Lithuania
Secular senators of the Polish–Lithuanian Commonwealth
Year of birth uncertain
Recipients of the Order of the White Eagle (Poland)